Percnarcha latipes is a species of moth of the family Gelechiidae. It was described by Francis Walker in 1865. It is found in Brazil.

References

Moths described in 1865
Gelechiinae